Richard Seymour Rodney (October 10, 1882 – December 22, 1963) was a justice of the Delaware Supreme Court, and later a United States district judge of the United States District Court for the District of Delaware.

Education and career

Born in New Castle, Delaware, Rodney read law in 1906. He was a Delaware National Guard First Lieutenant from 1899 to 1913. He was in private practice of law in Wilmington, Delaware from 1906 to 1922. He was a Mayor of New Castle from 1911 to 1917. He was an associate justice of the Supreme Court of Delaware from 1922 to 1946.

Federal judicial service

Rodney was nominated by President Harry S. Truman on July 25, 1946, to the United States District Court for the District of Delaware, to a new seat created by 60 Stat. 654. He was confirmed by the United States Senate on July 27, 1946, and received his commission on July 31, 1946. He assumed senior status on January 1, 1957. His service was terminated on December 22, 1963, due to his death.

References

Sources
 

1882 births
1963 deaths
Mayors of places in Delaware
Judges of the United States District Court for the District of Delaware
United States district court judges appointed by Harry S. Truman
20th-century American judges
National Guard (United States) officers
Justices of the Delaware Supreme Court
People from New Castle, Delaware
Delaware National Guard personnel
United States federal judges admitted to the practice of law by reading law